Myrteza Ali Struga (1878–1937) was an politician and medical doctor. He was one of the signatories of the Albanian Declaration of Independence.

For his contribution he was awarded Honor of Nation Order (Nder I kombit) by the Albanian president.

References

External links

Albanians from the Ottoman Empire
Signatories of the Albanian Declaration of Independence
All-Albanian Congress delegates
People from Struga
People from Manastir vilayet
1878 births
1937 deaths